Bobby Issazadhe (born 20,February 1961) is a Swedish former professional race car driver and Performance Racing team manager. Issazadhe competed in the 2001 British Formula Three Championship B-Class for two races, driving for the Performance Racing. Issazadhe remained with Performance for 2002, but his role changed to that of team manager. Issazadhe left Performance just before the start of the 2004 season. Since the A1GP got underway, Issazadhe has been manager of the Pakistan A1GP Team.

References

External links
 

1961 births
Living people
Swedish racing drivers
British Formula Three Championship drivers
A1 Grand Prix people

Performance Racing drivers